Choqa Maran may refer to:
 Choqa Maran (34°29′ N 47°00′ E), Kermanshah
 Choqa Maran (34°39′ N 46°52′ E), Kermanshah
 Choqamaran-e Bargur